Daniel Madlener (born 24 August 1964) is an Austrian football manager and a former player. He is the manager of SK Vorwärts Steyr.

Career

In 1987/88, Madlener signed for SK Vorwärts Steyr in the Austrian second division. After arriving, he became their figurehead for his technique, long hair, and lifestyle. That season , he and Ukrainian striker Oleg Blokhin, 1975 European Footballer of the Year, helped the club achieve promotion to the Austrian Bundesliga. As a result of his performances, Madlener played for the Austria national team and earned a move to SK Rapid Wien, Austria's most successful team before returning to SK Vorwärts Steyr after a year. In 1995/96, SK Vorwärts Steyr reached the round of 16 of the UEFA Intertoto Cup, but were relegated at the end of the season.

After retiring, Madlener worked as a teacher and coached amateur teams, helping Andelsbuch achieve promotion to the third division in 2011/12, the first time the club played above the fourth division. However, he did not stay because he claimed that they were "a village club whose top priority is to only use its own players" and was appointed head coach of professional second division side Lustenau 07 in 2013, his only full-time professional coaching job.

References

External links
 

Austrian footballers
Living people
Association football midfielders
Austrian football managers
1964 births
Austria international footballers
People from Feldkirch, Vorarlberg
FC St. Gallen players
SK Vorwärts Steyr players
SK Rapid Wien players
FC Linz players
TSV Hartberg players
Association football player-managers
SW Bregenz players
Footballers from Vorarlberg
SK Vorwärts Steyr managers